Protomelission is a Cambrian fossil taxon of contested affinity.  It comprises cataphract arrays of box-like chambers, forming a club-shaped thallus surrounding a hollow central cavity.  It was first described from phosphatized microfossils whose individual chambers were interpreted as housing the zooids of a non-mineralized bryozoan, which would make it the only Cambrian representative of that phylum – implying that all animal phyla originated in the Cambrian period.
The subsequent discovery of articulated macrofossils from the Xiaoshiba biota called into question the biological nature of the distal apertures, showing that the surface was instead covered with leaf-like triangular flanges.  This has led to the reinterpretation of the fossil material as a "seaweed", strictly as a dasycladalean green alga.

History of description 

Protomelission was first described by Brock & Cooper in 1993 from limestones in Wirrealpa, Australia.  A bryozoan affinity was dismissed on the basis that its walls were too thin, among other things.
The fossil material was complemented by additional specimens from China, causing Brock and colleagues to revisit this earlier statement.  A key line of evidence in favour of the bryozoan affinity was the regular array of openings exhibited by each chamber.  However, these openings were later argued to have arisen taphonomically, i.e. by abrasion of an originally solid wall, or by enlarging a much smaller original hole.  Where a bryozoan affinity would denote the presence of a stalked ring of tentacles emerging from each module, the recovery of macrofossil material with soft tissue preservation demonstrated that each chamber was instead associated with a tapering conical flange, better suited to photosynthesis.  Authors of the original study are unconvinced by this reinterpretation, suggesting in media reports that the absence of tentacles may in turn be an effect of imperfect preservation.

Available fossil material 

Protomelission is known from two distinct modes of preservation: small shelly fossils from Australia and China, which are millimetric phosphatized fragments; and Burgess Shale-type macrofossils, which preserve more delicate anatomy.  The former are fully three-dimensional; the latter, squashed into a couple of planes of mudstone.
These different preservational modes mean that the material from the two settings is not identical, and it is challenging to establish beyond doubt that the two forms of fossil belong to the same species, or even on a cynical view both to the same sort of organism. 
Whether or not the two types of fossil are conspecific, Yang et al. argue that the similarity in gross morphology is sufficient to show that a dasyclad interpretation is plausible for both sets of fossil material, and that the material cannot be considered a bona fide bryozoan.

References

Ulvophyceae
Fossils
Fossil taxa